Ex-treme Dating (styled EX-treme Dating) is an American reality television show that paired two people (one man and one woman) on a blind date. The couple was chaperoned on the date by two of the person's ex-partners. They talked to the other person via an earpiece, feeding hints for conversation topics and comments on the date itself. At the end of the date, one person waited for a limousine. If the other person was in the car, the couple got a second date paid for by the show. If the person's ex-partners were in the car, the ex-partners themselves won a prize.

The show was hosted by Jillian Barberie and premiered on July 8, 2002. The series ended on June 4, 2004 after two seasons.

External links
 Ex-treme Dating ratings underwhelming
 

American dating and relationship reality television series
2002 American television series debuts
2004 American television series endings
2000s American reality television series
2000s American game shows
Television series by 20th Century Fox Television
First-run syndicated television programs in the United States